Purabirbal is a village in Teh-Bah, Agra district. It is located near the banks of the Yamuna river and is known by other names such as Kachharpura and Gujjernkapura. The population of this village was near 750 in 2006. This village was established  in 1710 to 1750 (around 250 to 300 years ago) by the Lodhi community.

Villages in Agra district